USS Triangulum (AK-102) was a  commissioned by the US Navy for service in World War II. Triangulum was named after the constellation Triangulum. She was responsible for delivering troops, goods and equipment to locations in the Asiatic-Pacific Theater.

Construction
Triangulum was laid down 14 May 1943, under Maritime Commission (MARCOM) contract, MC hull No. 1669, as the Liberty ship SS Eugene B. Daskam, by California Shipbuilding Corporation, Terminal Island, Los Angeles, California; renamed Triangulum 27 May 1943; launched 6 June 1943; sponsored by Mrs. D. H. Mann; acquired by the Navy on 19 June 1943, from the War Shipping Administration (WSA) on a "bareboat" basis; converted to Navy use at the Destroyer Base, San Diego, California; and commissioned on 30 July 1943.

Service history  
The ship was one of five Navy manned Liberties assigned 8 December 1943, to the Southwest Pacific Area for service under operational control of the Commander, US Seventh Fleet in meeting US Army requirements. Assigned to the Naval Transportation Service (NTS), the auxiliary cargo ship moved up the coast to load cargo at San Francisco, California, and stood out to sea with a convoy on 28 August, bound for the New Hebrides. She arrived at Espiritu Santo on 2 October, and, for the next five months, shuttled troops and cargo between ports in Australia and New Guinea.

Landing troops at Humboldt Bay 
Triangulum embarked part of a battalion of Army combat engineers at Lae and sortied on 14 April 1944, with Task Group (TG) 77.1, the Western Attack Group, for the invasion of Hollandia. On the morning of 22 April, she began landing her 700 troops on the beaches of Humboldt Bay. The ship completed discharging cargo by 18:00 the next day and departed in a convoy bound, via Buna, for Milne Bay. She then resumed her supply runs between Australia and New Guinea.

Supplying the troops during the Philippine invasion 
The ship loaded combat cargo at Manus and got underway for Hollandia on 7 November, to rendezvous with a convoy proceeding to the Philippines. She arrived at Leyte Gulf on 19 November, and began discharging supplies. During her visit there, Japanese planes frequently attacked Allied shipping; and, during a raid on Thanksgiving Day, four of her men were wounded by friendly antiaircraft fire.

End-of-war activity 
On 4 December, she departed the area for Australia and, after calling at Hollandia, arrived at Brisbane, Australia, on 17 December 1944. Triangulum shuttled supplies from Australia to South Pacific bases, mostly in New Guinea, for the next year. The supply runs were broken by three voyages to the Philippines: in January, May, and August 1945. On 8 November, she stood out of Leyte to load cargo at Hollandia, Biak, Milne Bay, and Manus to be transported to the United States.

Post-war decommissioning 
On the last day of 1945, the ship arrived at San Francisco, where she was stripped for inactivation and ordered to join the Reserve Fleet in Hawaii. Triangulum arrived at Pearl Harbor on 23 February 1946, and was decommissioned there on 15 April. In May 1947, she was towed back to San Francisco and returned to MARCOM on 2 July. Triangulum was struck from the Navy list on 17 July 1947.

On 19 March 1973, she was sold to Nicolai Joffe Corporation, for $168,113, to be scrapped within 24 months. She was withdrawn from the fleet 27 July 1973.

Awards 
Triangulum received two battle stars for World War II service. Her crew was eligible for the following medals:
 Combat Action Ribbon (retroactive)
 American Campaign Medal
 Asiatic-Pacific Campaign Medal (2)
 World War II Victory Medal
 Philippines Liberation Medal

Notes 

Citations

Bibliography 

Online resources
 
 
 
 
 
Books

External links
 

Crater-class cargo ships
World War II auxiliary ships of the United States
Ships built in Los Angeles
1943 ships
Suisun Bay Reserve Fleet